Mantoida is a genus of praying mantises in the family Mantoididae. The species of this genus are native to Mexico, Central America, and South America.

Species
The following species are recognised in the genus Mantoida :
Mantoida argentinae
Mantoida beieri
Mantoida brunneriana
Mantoida burmeisteri
Mantoida fulgidipennis
†Mantoida matthiasglinki
Mantoida maya
Mantoida nitida
Mantoida ronderosi
Mantoida schraderi
Mantoida tenuis

See also 
List of mantis genera and species
Mantodea of North America
Mantodea of South America

References

External links 
Tree of Life - Mantoididae

 
Mantodea genera
Mantoididae
Mantodea of North America
Mantodea of South America